Osvary David Morrell Gutierrez Jr. (born January 18, 1998) is a Cuban professional boxer who has held the WBA (Regular) super middleweight title since 2021. As an amateur he won gold medals at the 2016 Youth World Championships and the 2017 Cuban National Championships.

Amateur career 
During an amateur career in which Morrell compiled a record of 130–2, he won gold medals at the 2016 Youth World Championships, where he was named "Best Boxer of the Tournament", 2017 Cuban National Championships, and the 2018 India Open International Boxing Tournament.

Professional career
Morrell made his professional debut on August 28, 2019, scoring a first-round knockout (KO) victory over Yendris Rodriguez Valdez at the Minneapolis Armory in Minneapolis, Minnesota.

He scored a second-round KO victory against Quinton Rankin in November before facing Lennox Allen for the vacant WBA interim super middleweight title on August 8, 2020, at the Microsoft Theater in Los Angeles, California. The bout featured on the undercard of the interim welterweight title fight between Thomas Dulorme and Jamal James. The event was originally scheduled to take place on April 11 but was postponed due to the COVID-19 pandemic. In what was described as a dominant performance, Morrell captured the WBA interim title via twelve-round unanimous decision (UD) with the judges' scorecards reading 120–108, 119–109, and 118–110. 

He was set to make the first defense of his title against Mike Gavronski on December 26 at the Shine Exposition Hall in Los Angeles. After Morrell failed to weigh within the super middleweight limit, reports claimed that he had been stripped of his title. However, it was later revealed that a clause in the fight contract allowed for the fight to continue as a non-title contest. Morrell defeated Gavronski via third-round KO.

The following month, Morrell was elevated from interim champion to Regular champion. The first defense of his Regular title came against Mario Cazares on June 27, 2021, at the Minneapolis Armory. Morrell Retained his title via first-round KO.

After defending his WBA (Regular) super-middleweight title on November 5, 2022 against Aidos Yerbossynuly, knocking him out in the 12th round, Aidos was hospitalized and put into an induced coma due to a subdural hematoma, bleeding on the brain.

Professional boxing record

References

External links

Living people
1998 births
Cuban male boxers
Super-middleweight boxers
Light-heavyweight boxers
Southpaw boxers
World Boxing Association champions
World super-middleweight boxing champions
People from Santa Clara, Cuba
21st-century Cuban people